Vyacheslav Valeriyovych Glazkov (born 15 October 1984) is a Ukrainian former professional boxer who competed from 2009 to 2016. He challenged once for the vacant IBF heavyweight title in 2016, losing to Charles Martin due to an anterior cruciate ligament injury. The injury eventually forced him to retire from the sport.

As an amateur, he won a silver medal at the 2007 World Amateur Boxing Championships and bronze at the 2008 Summer Olympics, both in the super-heavyweight division. He was forced to pull out in the semi-finals of the 2008 Olympics due to an elbow injury.

Amateur career
Glazkov won a gold medal at heavyweight in the first 2004 World University Boxing Championship by stopping Elchin Alizade.

He then moved up to super-heavyweight to compete in the 2005 World Amateur Boxing Championships where he outpointed Jaroslav Jaksto 26:20, but ran into the eventual winner Odlanier Solís early and lost 26:11.

At the 2006 Strandya Cup he beat David Price by RSCO (Referee Stopped the Contest-Outclassed), then lost by walkover to Kubrat Pulev.

At the 2007 World Amateur Boxing Championships, he out-pointed Colombian Oscar Rivas 23:7, stopped Jaroslav Jaksto, and defeated Chinese Zhang Zhilei 21:11 before losing in the semi-finals by 14:24 to the eventual winner, Italian southpaw Roberto Cammarelle.

Olympic results
2008 (as a super heavyweight)
Defeated Robert Alfonso (Cuba) 5:3
Defeated Newfel Ouatah (Algeria) 10:4
Lost to Zhang Zhilei (China) walkover, pulled out of bout with elbow injury.

World Amateur Championship results
2005 (as a super heavyweight)
Defeated Jaroslavas Jaksto (Lithuania) 26:20
Lost to Odlanier Solís (Cuba) 11:26

2007 (as a super heavyweight)
Defeated Răzvan Cojanu (Romania) RSCO 2
Defeated Oscar Rivas (Colombia) 23:7
Defeated Jaroslavas Jaksto (Lithuania) RSC 3
Defeated Zhang Zhilei (China) 21 11
Lost to Roberto Cammarelle (Italy) 14:24 (gold medal match)

Professional career

Glazkov made his professional debut on July 2, 2009 in Moscow. Nearly six years later, Glazkov defeated Steve Cunningham by unanimous decision on March 15, 2015 to earn a title fight against Tyson Fury. Following a petition from Glazkov's camp, Fury's recognition as IBF champion was withdrawn, citing his intention to fight a rematch with Wladimir Klitschko as the reason. Glazkov was matched with Charles Martin for the vacant title. The bout, which took place on January 16, 2016 at Barclays Center in Brooklyn, ended when Glazkov suffered an injury to his knee in the third round that rendered him unable to continue.

Professional boxing record

| style="text-align:center;" colspan="8"|21 wins (13 knockouts), 1 loss (1 knockout), 1 draw
|-  style="text-align:center; background:#e3e3e3;"
|  style="border-style:none none solid solid; "|Result
|  style="border-style:none none solid solid; "|Record
|  style="border-style:none none solid solid; "|Opponent
|  style="border-style:none none solid solid; "|Type
|  style="border-style:none none solid solid; "|Round
|  style="border-style:none none solid solid; "|Date
|  style="border-style:none none solid solid; "|Location
|  style="border-style:none none solid solid; "|Notes
|-
|Loss
|21-1-1
|align=left| Charles Martin
|
|
|
|align=left|
|align=left|
|-
|Win
|21-0-1
|align=left| Kertson Manswell
|
|
|
|align=left|
|align=left|
|- 
|Win
|20-0-1
|align=left| Steve Cunningham
|
|
|
|align=left|
|align=left|
|-
|Win
|19-0-1
|align=left| Darnell Wilson
|
|
|
|align=left|
|align=left|
|-
|Win
|18-0-1
|align=left| Derric Rossy
|||
|
|align=left|
|align=left|
|-
|Win
|17-0-1
|align=left| Tomasz Adamek
|
|
|
|align=left|
|align=left|
|-
|Win
|16-0-1
|align=left| Garrett Wilson
|
|
|
|align=left|
|align=left|
|-
|Win
|15-0-1
|align=left| Byron Polley
|
|
|
|align=left|
|align=left|
|-
|style="background:#abcdef;"|Draw
|14-0-1
|align=left| Malik Scott
|
|
|
|align=left|
|align=left|
|-
|Win
|14-0
|align=left| Tor Hamer
|
|
|
|align=left|
|align=left|
|-
|Win
|13-0
|align=left| Konstantin Airich
|
|
|
|align=left|
|align=left|
|-
|Win
|12-0
|align=left| Gbenga Oloukun
|
|
|
|align=left|
|align=left|
|-
|Win
|11-0
|align=left| Evgeny Orlov
|
|
|
|align=left|
|align=left|
|-
|Win
|10-0
|align=left| Daniil Peretyatko
|
|
|
|align=left|
|align=left|
|-
|Win
|9-0
|align=left| Denis Bakhtov
|
|
|
|align=left|
|align=left|
|-
|Win
|8-0
|align=left| Asker Balash
|
|
|
|align=left|
|align=left|
|-
|Win
|7-0
|align=left| Aziz Rahmonov
|
|
|
|align=left|
|align=left|
|-
|Win
|6-0
|align=left| Mark Brown
|
|
|
|align=left|
|align=left|
|-
|Win
|5-0
|align=left| Ivan Shvayko
|
|
|
|align=left|
|align=left|
|-
|Win
|4-0
|align=left| Ramon Hayes
|
|
|
|align=left|
|align=left|
|-
|Win
|3-0
|align=left| Stas Bilokon
|
|
|
|align=left|
|align=left|
|-
|Win
|2-0
|align=left| Alexey Varakin
|
|
|
|align=left|
|align=left|
|-
|Win
|1-0
|align=left| Özcan Cetinkaya
|
|
|
|align=left|
|align=left|

References

External links
 
 
 
 Twitter

1984 births
Living people
Super-heavyweight boxers
Olympic boxers of Ukraine
Boxers at the 2008 Summer Olympics
Olympic bronze medalists for Ukraine
Olympic medalists in boxing
Medalists at the 2008 Summer Olympics
Sportspeople from Luhansk
Ukrainian male boxers
AIBA World Boxing Championships medalists